Looking Glass Networks, Inc. was an American telecommunications company headquartered in Oak Brook, Illinois. The company provides rapid delivery of data transport services including SONET/SDH, Wavelength-division multiplexing and Ethernet as well as IP connectivity, dark fiber and carrier-neutral colocation. Looking Glass also offers custom design and build services for specific campus or data center requirements. On August 3, 2006, Level 3 Communications acquired Looking Glass, at which time the company's dark fiber offerings were deemphasized in favor of managed lit services. On November 1, 2017, CenturyLink completed its acquisition of Level 3 Communications.

Service locations
Services are available in the largest U.S. metro areas including: 
Atlanta, Georgia
Baltimore, Maryland
Chicago, Illinois
Dallas, Texas
Houston, Texas
Los Angeles, California
New York City Metro Area
Philadelphia, Pennsylvania
Silicon Valley, California
Seattle, Washington
Washington, D.C. Metro Area

Service detail
The company's physically diverse networks provide customers with connections to primary carrier hotels, incumbent local exchange carrier central offices, key enterprise buildings and other major data aggregation facilities. Looking Glass interconnects with more than 140 carriers, has over 760 points of presence, 430 on-net buildings and 860 Type II buildings. This connectivity, coupled with their protocol "agnostic" platform, allows Looking Glass to deliver flexible service options and fast delivery intervals to customers with significant bandwidth needs.

References

Companies based in DuPage County, Illinois
Oak Brook, Illinois
Level 3 Communications
Lumen Technologies
Telecommunications companies of the United States
2006 mergers and acquisitions